"The Disco Before the Breakdown" is the first single by the Gainesville, Florida-based punk rock band Against Me!, released in November 2002 by No Idea Records. It was the band's first release with bassist Andrew Seward, replacing original bassist Dustin Fridkin who had left the group several months prior. The lineup of Seward, Laura Jane Grace, James Bowman, and Warren Oakes would remain in place until 2009. The single was released as both a vinyl 7" and a compact disc. It is typically listed as an EP, though its format is typical of a single.

Critical reception
Reviewing "The Disco Before the Breakdown", Corey Apar of Allmusic gave it two out of five stars, calling it "A tolerable set of songs with personal lyrics, but with the exception of the relatively upbeat and horn-friendly title track, this EP is missing some of the group's standard energetic and reckless vigor; instead, listeners are left with a slight feeling of boredom."

Track listing

7" version

CD version

Personnel

Against Me!
 Laura Jane Grace – guitar, lead vocals, art concepts and layout
 James Bowman  – guitar, backing vocals
 Andrew Seward – bass guitar, backing vocals
 Warren Oakes – drums

Additional personnel
 Brian Pettit – backing vocals and horns on "The Disco Before the Breakdown"
 Patrick and Ryan Quinney, Samantha Jones, Todd Weissfeld, and Var Thelin – backing vocals on "The Disco Before the Breakdown"
 Jessica Mills – horns on "The Disco Before the Breakdown"
 Derron Nuhfter – producer, horns on "The Disco Before the Breakdown"

See also
Against Me! discography

References

External links
 "The Disco Before the Breakdown" at Against Me!'s official website – includes links to song lyrics

2002 singles
Against Me! songs
Songs written by Laura Jane Grace
2002 songs
Songs about disco
Songs against capitalism